is the 51st single by Japanese idol girl group AKB48. It was released in Japan by King Records on March 14, 2018. The single features Nana Okada as the center performer.

Release 
The single was released in 11 physical editions and as a digital EP on March 14, 2018.

Commercial performance 
"Jabaja" debuted atop the Oricon Singles Chart for the week ending March 18, 2018, with 1,115,843 physical copies sold. The song also debuted atop the Billboard Japan Hot 100 for the week of March 26, 2018.

On March 19, 2018, Billboard Japan reported that the single sold 1,106,382 copies in its first day, then 1,126,783 copies in its first three days, with additional 70,000 copies for a total of 1,202,909 copies sold in its first week, leading the Top Singles Sales chart.

The single was the 6th best-selling single of 2018 on Oricon. The song placed at number 33 at Billboard Japan Hot 100 Year End. It also placed at number 5 on Top Singles Sales Year End chart.

Track listing 

Notes

 "Jabaja" is performed by 27 members from Senbatsu
 "Pedal to Sharin to Kita Michi to" is performed by STU48
 "Position" is performed by AKB48 Wakate Senbatsu
 "Ai no Moake" is performed by SKE48
 "Hetawoutsu" is performed by NMB48
 "Buttaoreru Made" is performed by HKT48
 "Tomodachi de Imashou" is performed by NGT48 in Type D Edition and by Macharin and Friends in Theater Edition
 "Kokkyo no Nai Jidai" is performed by Sakamichi AKB

Members

Jabaja

Team A: Iriyama Anna, Kato Rena, Mukaichi Mion, Yokoyama Yui
Team K: Kojima Mako, Komiyama Haruka
Team B: Kashiwagi Yuki, Takahashi Juri
Team 4: Okada Nana, Ma Chia-Ling, Murayama Yuiri
Team 8: Okabe Rin, Oguri Yui, Kuranoo Narumi
Team S: Matsui Jurina
Team KII: Obata Yuna
Team E: Suda Akari
Team N: Yamamoto Sayaka
Team M: Shiroma Miru
Team BII: Ota Yuuri
Team H: Sashihara Rino, Tanaka Miku
Team KIV: Miyawaki Sakura
Team TII: Matsuoka Hana
Team NIII: Ogino Yuka, Nakai Rika
STU48 1st Generation: Takino Yumiko

"Pedal to Sharin to Kita Michi to"
STU48 (16 Members) (Takino Yumiko Center)

STU48 1st Generation: Ishida Chiho, Ishida Minami, Isogai Kanon, Ichioka Ayumi, Imamura Mitsuki, Iwata Hina, Okada Nana, Kadowaki Miyuna, Sano Haruka, Takino Yumiko, Tanaka Kouko, Torobu Yuri, Fukuda Akari, Fujiwara Azusa, Mori Kaho, Yabushita Fu

"Position"
AKB48 Wakate Senbatsu (AKB48若手選抜) (16 Members) (Mukaichi Mion Center)

Team A: Goto Moe, Chiba Erii, Nishikawa Rei, Mukaichi Mion
Team B: Kubo Satone, Taniguchi Megu, Hiwatashi Yui, Fukuoka Seina, Yamabe Ayu
Team 4: Asai Nanami, Kawamoto Saya, Yamauchi Mizuki
Team 8: Okabe Rin, Oguri Yui, Kuranoo Narumi, Sakaguchi Nagisa

"Ai no Moake"
SKE48 (16 Members) (Matsui Jurina Center)

Team S: Kitagawa Ryoha, Matsui Jurina
Team KII: Ego Yuna, Oba Mina, Obata Yuna, Kitano Ruka, Soda Sarina, Takayanagi Akane, Takeuchi Saki, Hidaka Yuzuki, Furuhata Nao
Team E: Kamata Natsuki, Kumazaki Haruka, Suenaga Oka, Sugawara Maya, Suda Akari

"Hetawoutsu"
NMB48 (16 Members) (Jo Eriko Center)

Team N: Kojima Karin, Tanigawa Airi, Mita Mao, Yamamoto Ayaka, Yamamoto Sayaka
Team M: Iwata Momoka, Kato Yuuka, Shibuya Nagisa, Shiroma Miru, Yasuda Momone, Yoshida Akari
Team BII: Uemura Azusa, Okita Ayaka, Jo Eriko, Jonishi Rei, Murase Sae

"Buttaoreru Made"
HKT48 (16 Members) (Sashihara Rino and Miyawaki Sakura Centers)

Team H: Kojina Yui, Komada Hiroka, Sashihara Rino, Tashima Meru, Tanaka Miku, Toyonaga Aki, Matsuoka Natsumi, Yabuki Nako
Team KIV: Iwahana Shino, Tomiyoshi Asuka, Tomonaga Mio, Miyawaki Sakura, Motomura Aoi, Moriyasu Madoka
Team TII: Matsuoka Hana, Murakawa Bibian

"Tomodachi de Imashou"
NGT48 (16 Members) (Takakura Moeka Center)

Team NIII: Ogino Yuka, Oguma Tsugumi, Kashiwagi Yuki, Kato Minami, Kitahara Rie, Sato Anju, Sugahara Riko, Takakura Moeka, Tano Ayaka, Nakai Rika, Nishigata Marina, Hasegawa Rena, Homma Hinata, Murakumo Fuka, Yamaguchi Maho, Yamada Noe

"Kokkyo no Nai Jidai"
Sakamichi AKB (坂道AKB) (18 Members) (Nagahama Neru Center)

Team A: Mukaichi Mion
Team 4: Okada Nana
Team 8: Okabe Rin, Oguri Yui
Team S: Matsui Jurina
Team KIV: Miyawaki Sakura
Nogizaka46 1st Generation: Saito Asuka
Nogizaka46 2nd Generation: Hori Miona
Nogizaka46 3rd Generation: Ozono Momoko, Kubo Shiori, Yamashita Mizuki, Yoda Yuuki
Kanji Keyakizaka46: Imaizumi Yui, Kobayashi Yui, Sugai Yuuka, Nagahama Neru, Watanabe Risa
Hiragana Keyakizaka46: Kato Shiho

"Tomodachi ga Dekita"
Macharin and Friends. (まちゃりんと仲間たち。) (12 Members) (Ma Chia-Ling Center)

Team A: Chiba Erii, Nishikawa Rei
Team B: Kubo Satone, Hiwatashi Yui, Yamabe Ayu
Team 4: Ma Chia-Ling
TPE48 Trainee: Chen Shih-ya, Chen Shih-yuan, Kuo Shin-yu, Lin Chieh, Chiu Pin-han, Chang Yu-lin

Charts

Weekly charts

Year-end charts

Certifications

Release history

References

External links 
 "Jabaja" singles information at AKB King Records 

AKB48 songs
2018 singles
2018 songs
Songs with lyrics by Yasushi Akimoto
King Records (Japan) singles
Oricon Weekly number-one singles
Billboard Japan Hot 100 number-one singles